The 2001 Big East Conference baseball tournament was held at Commerce Bank Ballpark in Bridgewater, New Jersey. This was the seventeenth annual Big East Conference baseball tournament. The  won their second tournament championship and claimed the Big East Conference's automatic bid to the 2001 NCAA Division I baseball tournament.

Format and seeding 
The Big East baseball tournament was a 4 team double elimination tournament in 2001. The top four regular season finishers were seeded one through four based on conference winning percentage only. Seton Hall claimed the third seed over Virginia Tech by tiebreaker.

Bracket

Jack Kaiser Award 
Isaac Pavlik was the winner of the 2001 Jack Kaiser Award. Pavlik was a junior pitcher for Seton Hall.

References 

Tournament
Big East Conference Baseball Tournament
Big East Conference baseball tournament
Big East Conference baseball tournament
Baseball in New Jersey
Bridgewater Township, New Jersey
College sports in New Jersey
Sports competitions in New Jersey
Sports in Somerset County, New Jersey
Tourist attractions in Somerset County, New Jersey